A list of films produced in Pakistan in 1960 (see 1960 in film) and in the Urdu language:

1960

See also
 1960 in Pakistan

References

External links
 Search Pakistani film - IMDB.com

1960
Pakistani
Films